Pericompsus laetulus is a species of ground beetle in the family Carabidae. It is found in Central America and North America.

References

Further reading

External links

 

Trechinae
Articles created by Qbugbot
Beetles described in 1852